The 53T6 (NATO reporting name: ABM-3 Gazelle, previously SH-08) is a Russian anti-ballistic missile.  Designed in 1978 and in service since 1995, it is a component of the A-135 anti-ballistic missile system.

The missile is able to intercept incoming re-entry vehicles at a distance of 80 km. The 53T6 is a two-stage solid-propellant rocket armed with a 10 kt thermonuclear weapon. (note: This is a neutron bomb that partially fissions the radioactive materials in the RV and prevents detonation of the hydrogen explosive. A neutron bomb is an enhanced fission implosion trigger that encounters a neutron emitter and is not correctly described as thermonuclear while the incoming hydrogen bomb it disables is a thermonuclear weapon.) The missile is about 10 meters in length and 1.8 meters in diameter. Its launch weight is 10 tons.

The 53T6 missile is kept in a silo-based launch container. Prior to launch its cover is blown off.

Maximal load manoeuvre capability is 210 g longitudinal and 90 g transverse.

Radar support
The Gazelle missile system is supported by the Don-2N Pill Box radar.

See also 
List of missiles
A-235 anti-ballistic missile system

Related US missiles
Nike Zeus
Sprint (missile)
Spartan (missile)

Treaties
Strategic Arms Limitation Talks
Anti-Ballistic Missile Treaty

References

External links 

 Video of test launching (This video is no longer available due to a copyright claim by XMD-TV)

Anti-ballistic missiles of Russia
Missile defense
53T6
Cold War surface-to-air missiles of the Soviet Union
Cold War military equipment of the Soviet Union
53T6
NPO Novator products
Military equipment introduced in the 1990s